Camross GAA is a Gaelic Athletic Association Hurling and Gaelic football club in County Laois, Ireland, located near to Coolrain.

History
Founded in 1903, the club is the most successful hurling club in County Laois and the club colours are famously black and amber.

In 1957 Camross amalgamated with Killanure their parish counterparts and with amalgamation came great success. In 1957 they won Junior Championship beating St Fintans, Colt, followed with Intermediate title in 1958.

The Camross club did not win the Laois Senior Hurling Championship until 1959 but since then they have added a record 25 more senior hurling titles to their roll of honour (26 titles in total). They last won the Laois Senior Hurling Championship in 2018 defeating Rathdowney Errill.  The last time they appeared in a county final was 2022, when defeated by Clough Ballacolla.

A previous chairman Michael Lalor also held the chair of office of Laois County Council in 2006. Michael and his brother were captains of the 1959 winning team. Other former chairmen of the club have been Tommy Delaney, Sean Mortimer, Mattie Collier, Kieran Delaney and Michael Scully. Current chairman is Jack Cuddy and is secretary Ursula Dunphy.

Camross has also won the Leinster Senior Club Hurling Championship twice. First they beat James Stephens of Kilkenny in 1976/77 and won against O'Tooles of Dublin in 1996/97. They were beaten in the 1977 club final by Glen Rovers at a game played in Thurles. They defeated Down side Ballycran in the semi-final, Camross lost the 1997 All Ireland semi-final to St. Mary's, Athenry again at Semple Stadium in Thurles.

Camross club man Michael Delaney held the full-time position as secretary of the Leinster Council of the GAA for well over a quarter of a century and was one of the top administrators in the sport.

Many famous Camross players have represented Laois at senior hurling over the years including Tim and Frank Keenan, P.J Cuddy, Joe Dollard, Martin Cuddy, Zane Keenan, Tim Cuddy, Sean Cuddy, John Carroll, and Joe Doran. Current Laois players are Mossie Keyes and Dan Delaney.

Football is very much a secondary sport in the club but Camross have won the Laois Junior Football Championship in 1980, the Laois Junior "B" Football Championship in 2005, 2016 and 2022 and the Laois Junior "C" Football Championship in 2014.

Camross winning Senior Hurling Captains.
1959 Fint Lalor
1963 Fint Lalor
1965 Tim Cuddy
1966 Tim Cuddy
1967 Tim Cuddy
1968 Ger Cuddy
1969 Ger Cuddy
1971 Jimmy Lyons
1973 John Carroll
1974 Christy Donovan
1976 Martin Cuddy
1977 Paddy Dowling
1978 Sean Cuddy
1979 Michael Cuddy
1980 Richard Maloney 
1985 P.J Cuddy
1986 Joe Doran
1988 Alo Delaney
1990 Patsy Carroll
1993 Fint Lalor
1994 Tommy Delaney
1996 Mattie Collier
2007 Fran Hogan
2013 Tomas Burke 
2017 Zane Keenan and Joe Phelan 
2018 Niall Holmes

Achievements

All-Ireland Senior Club Hurling Championships: 0
 1976–77 (runner up)
Leinster Senior Club Hurling Championships: O Neill Cup; 2
 1976, 1996
Laois Senior Hurling Championship: Bob O' Keefe Cup; 26
 1959, 1963, 1965, 1966, 1967, 1968, 1969, 1971, 1973, 1974, 1976, 1977, 1978, 1979, 1980, 1985, 1986, 1988, 1990, 1993, 1994, 1996, 2007, 2013, 2017, 2018
 Laois Senior Hurling Championship Runners-up;11
 1945,1964, 1981, 1983, 1989, 2000, 2005, 2010, 2014, 2015, 2022
 Laois Intermediate Hurling Championships Hetherington Cup; 5
 1939, 1958, 1983, 2000, 2010 Runners Up 2018
 Laois Junior Hurling Championships Fr. Phelan Cup; 11
 1914, 1921, 1928, 1957, 1964, 1972, 1981, 1988, 2003, 2008, 2014
 Laois Junior A Hurling Championships Runners-up 5 
 1945, 1964, 1965, 1995, 2006 
 Laois Junior B Hurling Championships: Eamon MacCluskey Cup; 5
 1988, 1989,1994, 2001, 2011; 
 Laois Junior B Hurling Championships Runners-up; 5
 2001, 2008, 2012, 2017, 2018
 Laois Junior C Hurling Championships; 2
 2006, 2016, 
 Laois Junior A Football Championships Shaw Cup; 1
 1980
 Laois Junior B Football Championships Chris Lalor Cup ; 3
 2005, 2016, 2022
 Laois Junior C Football Championship; 1
 2014
 Laois Division 5 Football League; 4
 1999, 2001, 2002, 2017 Runners-up 2018
 Laois Under 21 Hurling Championships Thomas Culliton Cup;18
 1965,1966,1967,1969,1970,1977,1987,1993,1994,1996,1997,1999,2005,2007,2008,2009,2010, 2018
 Laois Minor Hurling Championships Harry Grey Cup; 3
 2005,2017, 2021
 Laois Minor Hurling Runners-up;10
 1955,1962,1973,1985,1993 1996,2006,2007,2008,2010
 Laois Minor Hurling B Championships Michael Lalor Cup;3
 1992,2014,2015
 Laois Division 1 Hurling League O' Bradaigh Cup; 13 
 1975,1982,1983,1984,1987,1993,1994,1995,1998,1999,2000,2001, 2006, 2017, 2018
 Laois Division 1 Hurling League Runners-up;12
 1974,1988,1989,1991,1992,1996,1997,2002,2005,2007, 2015, 2022
 Laois Division 2 Hurling League Freedom Fighters Cup; 4
 1995,1997,2002,2008
 Laois Division 3 Hurling League Phil Shanahan Cup; 7
 1980,1981,1988,1995,1997,2003, 2018
 Palmer Cup'''; 4
 2009, 2010, 2014, 2017

References

Gaelic games clubs in County Laois
Hurling clubs in County Laois
Gaelic football clubs in County Laois